Pisania luctuosa is a species of sea snail, a marine gastropod mollusk in the family Pisaniidae.

Description

Distribution

References 

 Drivas, J.; Jay, M. (1987). Coquillages de La Réunion et de l'Île Maurice. Collection Les Beautés de la Nature. Delachaux et Niestlé: Neuchâtel. . 159 pp.
 Kilburn R.N., Marais J.P. & Fraussen K. (2010) Buccinidae. pp. 16–52, in: Marais A.P. & Seccombe A.D. (eds), Identification guide to the seashells of South Africa. Volume 1. Groenkloof: Centre for Molluscan Studies. 376 pp.

Pisaniidae
Gastropods described in 1880